Sympoliteia is a former municipality in Achaea, West Greece, Greece. Since the 2011 local government reform it is part of the municipality Aigialeia, of which it is a municipal unit. The municipal unit has an area of 85.505 km2. Population 6,311 (2011). The seat of the municipality was in Rododafni.

References

External links
Municipality of Sympoliteia 

Populated places in Achaea